Phlogochroa is a genus of moths of the family Erebidae.

Species
Phlogochroa albiguttula Hampson, 1926
Phlogochroa basilewskyi Berio, 1956
Phlogochroa fontainei Berio, 1956
Phlogochroa haematoessa (Holland, 1894)
Phlogochroa haemorrhanta (Bethune-Baker, 1911)
Phlogochroa madecassa Viette, 1972
Phlogochroa melanomesa Hampson, 1926
Phlogochroa pyrochroa (Bethune-Baker, 1909)
Phlogochroa raketaka Viette, 1972
Phlogochroa rubida (Holland, 1920)
Phlogochroa sejuncta (Walker, 1869)

References

External links
Natural History Museum Lepidoptera genus database

Calpinae